Humphrey is a city in Platte County, Nebraska, United States. The population was 760 at the 2010 census.

History
Humphrey was platted in 1880 when the Omaha, Niobrara and Black Hills Railroad was extended to that point. It was named after Humphrey, New York, the former hometown of the first postmaster.

Geography
Humphrey is located at  (41.690510, -97.486416).

Demographics

2000 census
At the 2000 census there were 786 people in 317 households, including 213 families, in the city. The population density was 1,808.4 people per square mile (705.8/km2). There were 328 housing units at an average density of 754.6 per square mile (294.5/km2).  The racial makeup of the city was 98.98% White, 0.25% African American, 0.38% Asian, 0.13% Pacific Islander, and 0.25% from two or more races. Hispanic or Latino of any race were 0.64%.

Of the 317 households 32.5% had children under the age of 18 living with them, 58.7% were married couples living together, 6.0% had a female householder with no husband present, and 32.8% were non-families. 30.9% of households were one person and 21.1% were one person aged 65 or older. The average household size was 2.47 and the average family size was 3.14.

The age distribution was 29.8% under the age of 18, 5.6% from 18 to 24, 23.7% from 25 to 44, 16.7% from 45 to 64, and 24.3% 65 or older. The median age was 39 years. For every 100 females, there were 99.0 males. For every 100 females age 18 and over, there were 88.4 males.

The median household income was $39,250, and the median family income  was $46,645. Males had a median income of $32,917 versus $21,719 for females. The per capita income for the city was $18,863. About 4.8% of families and 6.3% of the population were below the poverty line, including 10.3% of those under age 18 and 5.0% of those age 65 or over.

2010 census
At the 2010 census there were 760 people in 315 households, including 219 families, in the city. The racial makeup of the city was 98.2% White, 0.4% African American, 0.5% Native American, 0.8% from other races, and 0.1% from two or more races. Hispanic or Latino of any race were 0.7%.

Of the 315 households 31.7% had children under the age of 18 living with them, 59.4% were married couples living together, 7.6% had a female householder with no husband present, 2.5% had a male householder with no wife present, and 30.5% were non-families. 26.7% of households were one person and 15.3% were one person aged 65 or older. The average household size was 2.41 and the average family size was 2.92.

The median age was 40.6 years. 25.7% of residents were under the age of 18; 5% were between the ages of 18 and 24; 22.8% were from 25 to 44; 24% were from 45 to 64; and 22.5% were 65 or older. The gender makeup of the city was 50.8% male and 49.2% female.

Education
Humphrey Public Schools operates the single public school in the town: Humphrey Public School.

Notable person
Max Carl (Gronenthal), singer and songwriter for Grand Funk Railroad and .38 Special, grew up in Humphrey, and graduated from a Norfolk High School. He was with .38 Special for its Rock & Roll Strategy and Bone Against Steel albums, and co-wrote the #1 hit song "Second Chance".

References

Cities in Nebraska
Cities in Platte County, Nebraska